Margery Austin was a Canadian schooner from New Brunswick built in 1918.  On January 2, 1919, the Margery Austin was on voyage from Alma New Brunswick, to Saint John, Brunswick, when she ran aground off the Apple River in Nova Scotia.

References 

 

Schooners
Maritime history of Canada
Ships built in New Brunswick
1918 ships
Sailing ships of Canada